The 2014 South Carolina Gamecocks baseball team represents the University of South Carolina in the 2014 NCAA Division I baseball season.  The Gamecocks play their home games in Carolina Stadium. The team is coached by Chad Holbrook, who is in his second season as head coach at Carolina.

Personnel

Roster

2014 South Carolina Gamecocks Baseball Roster & Bios http://gamecocksonline.cstv.com/sports/m-basebl/mtt/scar-m-basebl-mtt.html>

Coaching staff

2014 South Carolina Gamecocks Baseball Coaches & Bios http://gamecocksonline.cstv.com/sports/m-basebl/mtt/scar-m-basebl-mtt.html#coaches

Schedule

! style="background:#73000A;color:white;"| Regular Season
|- valign="top" 

|- bgcolor="#bbbbbb"
| – || February 14 ||  || Carolina Stadium || colspan=7 |Postponed
|- bgcolor="#ccffcc"
| 1 || February 15 || Bucknell || Carolina Stadium || 17-4 || Montgomery (1-0) || Hough (0-1) || None || 8,015 || 1–0 ||–
|- bgcolor="#ccffcc"
| 2 || February 15 || Bucknell || Carolina Stadium || 12-2 || Wynkoop (1-0) || Weigel (0-1) || None || 7,822 || 2–0 ||–
|- bgcolor="#ccffcc"
| 3 || February 16 || Bucknell || Carolina Stadium || 12-0 || Crowe (1-0) || Andreychik (0-1) || None || 7,512 || 3–0 || –
|- bgcolor="#ccffcc"
| 4 || February 18 ||  || Carolina Stadium || 4-0 || Reagan (1-0) || Kehner (0-1) || None || 6,642 || 4–0 ||–
|- bgcolor="#ccffcc"
| 5 || February 21 ||  || Carolina Stadium || 4-0 || Montgomery (2-0) || Cobb (1-1) || None || 6,842 || 5–0 ||–
|- bgcolor="#ccffcc"
| 6 || February 22 || Eastern Kentucky || Carolina Stadium || 2-0 || Wynkoop (2-0) || Perkins (0-1) || Seddon (1) || 8,242 || 6–0 ||–
|- bgcolor="#ccffcc"
| 7 || February 23 || Eastern Kentucky || Carolina Stadium || 6-0 || Crowe (2-0) || Scott (0-2) || None || 7,731 || 7–0 ||–
|- bgcolor="#ccffcc"
| 8 || February 28 || Clemson || Carolina Stadium || 9-6 || Mincey (1-0) || Bates (0-1) || Seddon (2) || 8,242 || 8–0 ||–
|-

|- bgcolor="#ccffcc"
| 9 || March 1 || vs. Clemson || Fluor Field || 10-2 || Wynkoop (3-0) || Crownover (2-1) || Seddon (3) || 7,182 || 9–0 ||–
|- bgcolor="#ccffcc"
| 10 || March 2 || @ Clemson || Doug Kingsmore Stadium || 5-3 || Mincey (2-0) || Schmidt (1-2) || None || 6,016 || 10–0 ||–
|- bgcolor="#ccffcc"
| 11 || March 4 ||  || Carolina Stadium || 7-1 || Reagan (2-0) || Powers (1-2) || None || 6,306 || 11–0 ||–
|- bgcolor="#ccffcc"
| 12 || March 5 || Stetson || Carolina Stadium || 4-2 || Privette (1-0) || Warmoth (0-2) || Seddon (4) || 6,427 || 12–0 ||–
|- bgcolor="#bbbbbb"
| - || March 7 ||  || Carolina Stadium || colspan=7 |Postponed
|- bgcolor="#ccffcc"
| 13 || March 8 || Brown || Carolina Stadium || 13-0 || Montgomery (3-0) || Galan (0-1) || None || 7,163 || 13–0 ||–
|- bgcolor="#ccffcc"
| 14 || March 8 || Brown || Carolina Stadium || 8-0 || Wynkoop (4-0) || St. Lawrence (0-1) || None || 7,546 || 14–0 ||–
|- bgcolor="#ccffcc"
| 15 || March 9 || Brown || Carolina Stadium || 1-0 || Crowe (3-0) || Taugner (0-1) || Seddon (5) || 6,903 || 15–0 ||–
|- bgcolor="#ccffcc"
| 16 || March 11 ||  || Carolina Stadium || 5-0 || Widener (1-0) || Greenfield (1-1) || None || 7,174 || 16–0 ||–
|- align="center" bgcolor="#ffbbb"
| 17 || March 14 || Ole Miss || Carolina Stadium || 4-6 || Ellis (3-0) || Montgomery (3-1) || Laxer (1) || 7,859 || 16–1 ||0–1
|- bgcolor="#ccffcc"
| 18 || March 15 || Ole Miss || Carolina Stadium || 5-410 || Seddon (1-0) || Denny (0-1) || None || 7,835 || 17–1 ||1–1
|- bgcolor="#ccffcc"
| 19 || March 15 || Ole Miss || Carolina Stadium || 3-1 || Crowe (4-0) || Smith (3-1) || Seddon (6) || 7,349 || 18–1 ||2–1
|- bgcolor="#bbbbbb"
| - || March 18 || @ The Citadel || Joseph P. Riley Jr. Park || colspan=7 |Postponed
|- align="center" bgcolor="#ffbbb"
| 20 || March 21 || @ Kentucky || Cliff Hagan Stadium || 5-13 || Reed (4-1) || Montgomery (3-2) || None || 1,937 || 18–2 ||2–2
|- align="center" bgcolor="#ffbbb"
| 21 || March 22 || @ Kentucky || Cliff Hagan Stadium || 1-2 || Shepherd (5-0) || Wynkoop (4-1) || Salow (1) || 2,220 || 18–3 ||2–3
|- bgcolor="#ccffcc"
| 22 || March 23 || @ Kentucky || Cliff Hagan Stadium || 8-3 || Crowe (5-0) || Nelson (1-1) || Seddon (7) || 1,870 || 19–3 ||3–3
|- bgcolor="#ccffcc"
| 23 || March 25 ||  || Carolina Stadium || 4-2 || Reagan (3-0) || Thornton (0-2) || Mincey (1) || 7,170 || 20–3 ||–
|- bgcolor="#ccffcc"
| 24 || March 26 ||  || Carolina Stadium || 4-0 || Britt (1-0) || Moats (0-3) || None || 6,982 || 21–3 ||–
|- bgcolor="#ccffcc"
| 25 || March 28 ||  || Carolina Stadium || 3-214 || Wynkoop (5-1) || Bettencourt (0-1) || None || 7,506 || 22–3 ||4–3
|- bgcolor="#ccffcc"
| 26 || March 29 || Tennessee || Carolina Stadium || 9-6 || Scott (1-0) || Owenby (2-1) || None || 7,473 || 23–3 ||5–3
|- bgcolor="#ccffcc"
| 27 || March 30 || Tennessee || Carolina Stadium || 8-0 || Crowe (6-0) || Lee (3-1) || None || 8,242 || 24–3 ||6–3
|-

|- bgcolor="#ccffcc"
| 28 || April 1 ||  || Carolina Stadium || 2-1 || Fiori (1-0) || Thurber (0-3) || None || 7,416 || 25–3 ||–
|- bgcolor="#bbbbbb"
| - || April 3 || @ Arkansas || Baum Stadium || colspan=7 |Postponed
|- bgcolor="#ccffcc"
| 29 || April 4 || @ Arkansas || Baum Stadium || 2-1 || Montgomery (4-2) || Killian (1-5) || Seddon (8) || 9,947 || 26–3 ||7–3
|- align="center" bgcolor="#ffbbb"
| 30 || April 4 || @ Arkansas || Baum Stadium || 1-4 || Beeks (5-2) || Wynkoop (5-2) || None || 9,947 || 26–4 ||7–4
|- align="center" bgcolor="#ffbbb"
| 31 || April 5 || @ Arkansas || Baum Stadium || 0-7 || Oliver (3-3) || Crowe (6-1) || None || 10,103 || 26–5 ||7–5
|- bgcolor="#ccffcc"
| 32 || April 8 || @  || Fluor Field || 9-2 || Widener (2-0) || Dittmar (0-2) || None || 4,247 || 27–5 ||–
|- bgcolor="#ccffcc"
| 33 || April 11 || Florida || Carolina Stadium || 4-1 || Montgomery (5-2) || Shore (3-2) || Seddon (9) || 8,242 || 28–5 ||8–5
|- align="center" bgcolor="#ffbbb"
| 34 || April 12 || Florida || Carolina Stadium || 3-4 || Puk (3-2) || Seddon (1-1) || None || 8,242 || 28–6 ||8–6
|- align="center" bgcolor="#ffbbb"
| 35 || April 13 || Florida || Carolina Stadium || 5-6 || Dunning (1-0) || Crowe (6-2) || Hanhold (2) || 8,242 || 28–7 ||8–7
|- align="center" bgcolor="#ffbbb"
| 36 || April 15 ||  || Carolina Stadium || 1-4 || Buckley (2-0) || Beal (0-1) || Weekley (7) || 7,415 || 28–8 ||–
|- align="center" bgcolor="#ffbbb"
| 37 || April 16 || @ The Citadel || Joseph P. Riley Jr. Park || 8-10 || Livingston (2-4) || Vogel (0-1) || Hunter (7) || 6,500 || 28–9 ||–
|- bgcolor="#bbbbbb"
| - || April 18 || @  || Plainsman Park || colspan=7 |Postponed
|- align="center" bgcolor="#ffbbb"
| 38 || April 19 || @ Auburn || Plainsman Park || 2-4 || Ortman (7-2) || Montgomery (5-3) || None || 3,770 || 28–10 ||8–8
|- bgcolor="#ccffcc"
| 39 || April 19 || @ Auburn || Plainsman Park || 3-2 || Mincey (3-0) || Wade (3-2) || Seddon (10) || 4,096 || 29–10 ||9–8
|- bgcolor="#ccffcc"
| 40 || April 20 || @ Auburn || Plainsman Park || 4-3 || Seddon (2-1) || Cochran-Gill (0-2) || None || 3,084 || 30–10 ||10–8
|- bgcolor="#ccffcc"
| 41 || April 22 ||  || Carolina Stadium || 8-0 || Widener (3-0) || Beeker (2-2) || None || 6,886 || 31–10 ||–
|- bgcolor="#ccffcc"
| 42 || April 23 ||  || Carolina Stadium || 6-1 || Britt (2-0) || Birklund (0-7) || None || 7,102 || 32–10 ||–
|- bgcolor="#ccffcc"
| 43 || April 25 || Alabama || Carolina Stadium || 9-3 || Montgomery (6-3) || Turnbull (5-3) || Seddon (11) || 8,242 || 33–10 ||11–8
|- align="center" bgcolor="#ffbbb"
| 44 || April 26 || Alabama || Carolina Stadium || 1-2 || Kamplain (4-2) || Wynkoop (5-3) || Burrows (9) || 8,242 || 33–11 ||11–9
|- bgcolor="#ccffcc"
| 45 || April 27 || Alabama || Carolina Stadium || 9-3 || Mincey (4-0) || Eicholtz (2-1) || Seddon (12) || 8,074 || 34–11 ||12–9
|-

|- align="center" bgcolor="#ffbbb"
| 46 || May 2 || @  || Foley Field || 1-3 || Lawlor (4-4) || Montgomery (6-4) || None || 2,682 || 34–12 ||12–10
|- bgcolor="#ccffcc"
| 47 || May 3 || @ Georgia || Foley Field || 5-2 || Wynkoop (6-3) || Ripple (2-1) || Seddon (13) || 3,256 || 35–12 ||13–10
|- align="center" bgcolor="#ffbbb"
| 48 || May 4 || @ Georgia || Foley Field || 3-5 || Sosebee (1-3) || Crowe (6-3) || Cheek (1) || 3,078 || 35–13 ||13–11
|- bgcolor="#ccffcc"
| 49 || May 7 ||  || Carolina Stadium || 15-1 || Britt (3-0) || Accetta (3-3) || None || 7,274 || 36–13 ||–
|- bgcolor="#ccffcc"
| 50 || May 9 || Missouri || Carolina Stadium || 8-2 || Montgomery (7-4) || Graves (3-5) || None || 7,419 || 37–13 ||14–11
|- bgcolor="#ccffcc"
| 51 || May 10 || Missouri || Carolina Stadium || 3-1 || Wynkoop (7-3) || Fairbanks (4-6) || Seddon (14) || 7,903 || 38–13 ||15–11
|- bgcolor="#ccffcc"
| 52 || May 11 || Missouri || Carolina Stadium || 2-1 || Mincey (5-0) || Steele (0-8) || None || 7,307 || 39–13 ||16–11
|- bgcolor="#ccffcc"
| 53 || May 13 || The Citadel || Carolina Stadium || 10-1 || Scott (2-0) || Brecklin (0-1) || None || 8,054 || 40–13 ||–
|- bgcolor="#ccffcc"
| 54 || May 15 || @ Vanderbilt || Hawkins Field || 4-310 || Seddon (3-1) || Miller (1-1) || None || 2,819 || 41–13 ||17–11
|- align="center" bgcolor="#ffbbb"
| 55 || May 16 || @ Vanderbilt || Hawkins Field || 3-9 || Fulmer (5-1) || Wynkoop (7-4) || Stone (3) || 3,429 || 41–14 ||17–12
|- bgcolor="#ccffcc"
| 56 || May 17 || @ Vanderbilt || Hawkins Field || 6-3 || Crowe (7-3) || Ravenelle (3-1) || Seddon (15) || 3,626 || 42–14 ||18–12
|-

|-
! style="background:#73000A;color:white;"| Post-Season
|-

|- align="center" bgcolor="#ffbbb"
| 57 || May 21 || Mississippi State || Hoover Metropolitan Stadium || 0-127 || Lindgren (6-1) || Montgomery (7-5) || None || 7,526 || 42–15 ||0–1
|- align="center" bgcolor="#ffbbb"
| 58 || May 22 || Florida || Hoover Metropolitan Stadium || 2-7 || Poyner (5-3) || Wynkoop (7-5) || None || 5,115 || 42–16 ||0–2
|-

|- bgcolor="#ccffcc"
| 59 || May 30 ||  || Carolina Stadium || 5-2 || Montgomery (8-5) || Bowers (10-4) || None || 7,382 || 43–16 || 1–0
|- align="center" bgcolor="#ffbbb"
| 60 || May 31 || Maryland || Carolina Stadium || 3-4 || Shawaryn (11-3) || Wynkoop (7-6) || Mooney (12) || 6,813 || 43–17 || 1–1
|- bgcolor="#ccffcc"
| 61 || June 1 || Campbell || Carolina Stadium || 9-0 || Crowe (8-3) || Koopman (8-2) || None || 5,986 || 44–17 || 2–1
|- align="center" bgcolor="#ffbbb"
| 62 || June 1 || Maryland || Carolina Stadium || 10-1 || Stiles (5-2) || Seddon (3-2) || Ruse (1) || 6,340 || 44–18 || 2–2
|-

2014 South Carolina Gamecocks Baseball Schedule http://gamecocksonline.cstv.com/sports/m-basebl/sched/scar-m-basebl-sched.html>

Honors and awards
 Wil Crowe was named SEC Pitcher of the Week on February 18, SEC Freshman of the Week on February 25, and Collegiate Baseball Freshman All-American.
 Tanner English was named Second-Team All-SEC.
 Grayson Greiner was named SEC Player of the Week on March 31, SEC All-Defensive Team, Baseball America Second-Team All-American, and Johnny Bench Award semifinalist.
 Joey Pankake was named to the SEC All-Defensive Team.
 Joel Seddon was named Second-Team All-SEC. and NCBWA Second-Team All-American.

Rankings

Gamecocks in the 2014 MLB Draft
The following members of the South Carolina Gamecocks baseball program were drafted in the 2014 Major League Baseball Draft.

References

External links
 Gamecock Baseball official website 

South Carolina Gamecocks baseball seasons
South Carolina Gamecocks Baseball Team, 2014
South Carolina
South